Buy Buy Baby, Inc. (stylized: buybuy BABY) is an American chain of stores that sell clothing, strollers and other items for use with infants and young children. It operates 133 stores across the United States.

The chain was founded in 1996 by brothers Richard and Jeffrey Feinstein, sons of Bed Bath & Beyond co-founder Leonard Feinstein. It consisted of eight stores when it was acquired by Bed Bath & Beyond in 2007 for $67 million. Its primary competitor was Babies "R" Us until 2018, when Toys "R" Us, Babies "R" Us' parent, filed for bankruptcy and closed all U.S. locations in 2018.

On February 10, 2023, it was revealed that its parent company, Bed Bath & Beyond, intended to cease its Canadian division, closing all stores including Buy Buy Baby locations. According to court documents, the business does not have the "capacity or ability to independently effect a recapitalization or restructuring of the Canadian operations without access to cash and the support".

References

External links

1996 establishments in California
Retail companies established in 1996
Retail companies of the United States
Companies based in San Francisco
2007 mergers and acquisitions
Companies that have filed for bankruptcy in Canada
2023 disestablishments in Canada